Oregon is  north to south at longest distance, and  east to west. It is the ninth largest state in the United States. Oregon claims the D River as the shortest river in the world, though the state of Montana makes the same claim of its Roe River.

Oregon is split into eight geographical regions. In Western Oregon: Oregon Coast (west of the Coast Range), the Willamette Valley, Rogue Valley, Cascade Range and Klamath Mountains; and in Central and Eastern Oregon: the Columbia Plateau, the High Desert, and the Blue Mountains.

Oregon lies in two time zones. Most of Malheur County is in the Mountain Time Zone, while the rest of the state lies in the Pacific Time Zone.

Geology and terrain

Western Oregon's mountainous regions, home to three of the most prominent mountain peaks of the United States including Mount Hood, were formed by the volcanic activity of the Juan de Fuca Plate, a tectonic plate that poses a continued threat of volcanic activity and earthquakes in the region. The most recent major activity was the 1700 Cascadia earthquake. Washington's Mount St. Helens erupted in 1980, an event visible from northern Oregon and affecting some areas there.

The Columbia River, which forms much of Oregon's northern border, also played a major role in the region's geological evolution, as well as its economic and cultural development. The Columbia is one of North America's largest rivers, and one of two rivers to cut through the Cascades (the Klamath River in southern Oregon is the other). About 15,000 years ago, the Columbia repeatedly flooded much of Oregon during the Missoula Floods; the modern fertility of the Willamette Valley is largely the result. Plentiful salmon made parts of the river, such as Celilo Falls, hubs of economic activity for thousands of years.

Today, Oregon's landscape varies from rain forest in the Coast Range to barren desert in the southeast, which still meets the technical definition of a frontier. Oregon's geographical center is further west than any of the other 48 contiguous states (although the westernmost point of the lower 48 states is in Washington). Central Oregon's geographical features range from high desert and volcanic rock formations resulting from lava beds. The Oregon Badlands Wilderness is in this region of the state.

Flora and fauna

Typical of a western state, Oregon is home to a unique and diverse array of wildlife. Roughly 60 percent of the state is covered in forest, while the areas west of the Cascades are more densely populated by forest, making up around 80 percent of the landscape. Some 60 percent of Oregon's forests are within federal land. Oregon is the top timber producer of the lower 48 states.
 Typical tree species include the Douglas fir (the state tree), as well as redwood, ponderosa pine, western red cedar, and hemlock. Ponderosa pine are more common in the Blue Mountains in the eastern part of the state and firs are more common in the west.

 Many species of mammals live in the state, which include opossums, shrews, moles, little pocket mice, great basin pocket mice, dark kangaroo mouse, California kangaroo rat, chisel-toothed kangaroo rat, ord's kangaroo rat, bats, rabbits, pikas, mountain beavers, chipmunks, squirrels, yellow-bellied marmots, beavers (the state mammal), porcupines, coyotes, wolves, foxes black bears, raccoons, badgers, skunks, antelopes, cougars, bobcats, lynxes, deer, elk, and moose.
 Marine mammals include seals, sea lions, humpback whales, killer whales, gray whales, blue whales, sperm whales, pacific white-sided dolphins, and bottlenose dolphins.
 Notable birds include American widgeons, mallard ducks, great blue herons, bald eagles, golden eagles, western meadowlarks (the state bird), barn owls, great horned owls, rufous hummingbirds, pileated woodpeckers, wrens, towhees, sparrows, and buntings.
Moose have not always inhabited the state but came to Oregon in the 1960s; the Wallowa Valley herd numbered about 60 . Gray wolves were extirpated from Oregon around 1930 but have since found their way back; most reside in northeast Oregon, with two packs living in the south-central part. Although their existence in Oregon is unconfirmed, reports of grizzly bears still turn up, and it is probable some still move into eastern Oregon from Idaho.

Oregon is home to what is considered the largest single organism in the world, an Armillaria solidipes fungus beneath the Malheur National Forest of eastern Oregon.

Oregon has several National Park System sites, including Crater Lake National Park in the southern part of the Cascades, John Day Fossil Beds National Monument east of the Cascades, Lewis and Clark National Historical Park on the north coast, and Oregon Caves National Monument near the south coast.

Climate

Most of Oregon has a generally mild climate, though there is significant variation given the variety of landscapes across the state. The state's western region (west of the Cascade Range) has an oceanic climate, populated by dense evergreen mixed forests. Western Oregon's climate is heavily influenced by the Pacific Ocean; the western third of Oregon is very wet in the winter, moderately to very wet during the spring and fall, and dry during the summer. The relative humidity of Western Oregon is high except during summer days, which are semi-dry to semi-humid; Eastern Oregon typically sees low humidity year-round.

The state's southwestern portion, particularly the Rogue Valley, has a Mediterranean climate with drier and sunnier winters and hotter summers, similar to Northern California.

Oregon's northeastern portion has a steppe climate, and its high terrain regions have a subarctic climate. Like Western Europe, Oregon, and the Pacific Northwest in general, is considered warm for its latitude, and the state has far milder winters at a given elevation than comparable latitudes elsewhere in North America, such as the Upper Midwest, Ontario, Quebec and New England. However, the state ranks fifth for coolest summer temperatures of any state in the country, after Maine, Idaho, Wyoming, and Alaska.

The eastern two thirds of Oregon, which largely comprise high desert, have cold, snowy winters and very dry summers. Much of the east is semiarid to arid like the rest of the Great Basin, though the Blue Mountains are wet enough to support extensive forests. Most of Oregon receives significant snowfall, but the Willamette Valley, where 60 percent of the population lives, has considerably milder winters for its latitude and typically sees only light snowfall.

Climate data

Cities and towns

Oregon's population is largely concentrated in the Willamette Valley, which stretches from Eugene in the south (home of the University of Oregon) through Corvallis (home of Oregon State University) and Salem (the capital) to Portland (Oregon's largest city).

Astoria, at the mouth of the Columbia River, was the first permanent English-speaking settlement west of the Rockies in what is now the United States. Oregon City, at the end of the Oregon Trail, was the Oregon Territory's first incorporated city, and was its first capital from 1848 until 1852, when the capital was moved to Salem. Bend, near the geographic center of the state, is one of the ten fastest-growing metropolitan areas in the United States. In southern Oregon, Medford is a rapidly growing metro area and is home to the Rogue Valley International-Medford Airport, the state's third-busiest airport. To the south, near the California border, is the city of Ashland. Eastern Oregon is sparsely populated, but is home to Hermiston, which with a population of 18,000 is the largest and fastest-growing city in the region.

See also
 List of regions of Oregon
 Geography of Washington (state)
 Cascadia (region)

References

Geography of Oregon